Peinaleopolynoe is a genus belonging to the family Polynoidae (scale worms). Members of this genus generally live in nutrient-rich environments in the deep sea, such as whale fall, which is the reason for their name (Greek plural , ; "famished").

Description 
Species in this genus are short segmented scale worms with 21 segments. They are covered in large, overlapping, kidney-shaped plates (elytra). The bristles (chaetae) on both sides can be seen from above, as they are not covered by the plates. They do not have any eyes.

The four species discovered in 2020 were described as 'glitter worms' due to their shiny and colorful bristles and plates. One of the species, P. elvisi, was named after Elvis Presley, as the shimmering plates reminded the researchers of the sequins on his jumpsuit.

Species 
The genus contains 6 recognized species as of June 2020.

 P. sillardi (Desbruyères & Laubier, 1988)
 P. santacatalina (Pettibone, 1993)
 P. orphanae (Hatch & Rouse, 2020)
 P. elvisi (Hatch & Rouse, 2020)
 P. goffrediae (Hatch & Rouse, 2020)
 P. mineoi (Hatch & Rouse, 2020)

References

External links
WORMS entry

Polychaete genera
Phyllodocida